Empress Ma or Empress Dowager Ma may refer to:

 Empress Ma (Han dynasty) (40–79), empress of Emperor Ming of Han, empress dowager during Emperor Zhang's reign
 Empress Dowager Ma (Former Liang) (died 362), mother of Zhang Chonghua
 Empress Ma (Southern Han) (died 935), empress of Liu Yan (Emperor Gaozu of Southern Han)
 Empress Ma (Northern Han), empress of Liu Jiyuan (Emperor Yingwudi of Northern Han)
 Empress Ma (Hongwu) (1332–1382), empress of the Hongwu Emperor
 Empress Ma (Jianwen) (1378–1402), empress of the Jianwen Emperor
 Empress Dowager Ma (Southern Ming) (1578–1669), mother of Zhu Youlang

Ma